The pulp and paper industry in India is one of the major producers of paper in the world, but is outside the top 10. In recent years, India has adopted new manufacturing technology.

References

[{tnpl, located in Chennai,Tamil Nadu,India}]